Little Britain is a British sketch comedy series that began as a radio show in 2000 and ran as a television series between 2003 and 2006. It was written and performed by David Walliams and Matt Lucas. Financed by the BBC, the radio series was first broadcast on BBC Radio 4, with the initial two television series premiering on BBC Three and the third and final series on BBC One.

The programme consists of a series of sketches involving exaggerated parodies of British people from various walks of life. Each sketch was introduced by a voice-over narration (Tom Baker) suggesting that the programme was a guide – aimed at non-British people – to British society. Despite the narrator's description of "great British institutions", the comedy arises from the British audience's self-deprecating understanding of either themselves or of people known to them. Recurring characters included Andy Pipkin, who falsely presented himself as requiring the use of a wheelchair to gain the attention of his carer Lou Todd; Daffyd Thomas, who claims to be "the only gay in the village" despite much evidence to the contrary; and Vicky Pollard, presented as a working-class chav engaging in anti-social behaviour.

The programme's title is in relation to the term Little Englander (a reference to narrow-mindedness and complacent singularity, exhibited by many subjects of the sketches) and Great Britain. It spurred a live show which toured internationally between 2005 and 2007, various specials for the Comic Relief charity marathons, and the HBO-produced Little Britain USA spin-off in 2008. Walliams and Lucas followed Little Britain with another sketch show, Come Fly with Me.

The series was popular and received high viewing figures, receiving 9.5 million viewers following its move to BBC One in 2005. Despite the series’s popularity, commentators expressed concern on the impact that the show had on the large numbers of children who watched it and on the heavy use of toilet humour, particularly in the second and third series. Concerns were also raised regarding the perceived derogatory manner in which Little Britain depicted women and minority groups. In 2017, Lucas stated that he had come to agree with the latter criticism. In 2020, the show was removed from various UK streaming services due to its use of blackface and then on 16 March 2022, the BBC made Little Britain available to view on BBC iPlayer again with some characters being cut from the original release.

History

Radio show
Little Britain initially appeared as a radio show, produced by Edward Flinn, which ran on BBC Radio 4 from 2000 until 2002.

Radio 4 began a rerun of all nine episodes in February 2004 (which were slightly edited for content to suit the 6:30 pm timeslot). Unusually, this overlapped with a rerun, beginning in mid-March, of the first five programmes on the digital radio channel BBC 7. In June–July 2004 BBC 7 broadcast the remaining four.

It was announced in October 2019 that the series would return for a one-off radio special, titled Little Brexit, on BBC Radio 4 on 31 October 2019.

Television series

Like several other BBC comedies (such as Dead Ringers and The Mighty Boosh), Little Britain made the transition from radio to television. All the episodes for the series were filmed at Pinewood Studios. Much of the TV material was adapted from the radio version, but with more emphasis on recurring characters and catchphrases.

Series One, 2003
The first TV series was one of the new programmes in the launch line-up for digital channel BBC Three, the replacement for BBC Choice, which launched in February 2003. As a result of its success, the first series was repeated on the more widely available BBC Two. Although reactions were mixed, many critics were enthusiastic, and the programme was commissioned for another run. Part of the series was filmed in Kent at Herne Bay: Emily Howard the Lady, and the Lou and Andy sketches. Every episode of the series ended with a failed world record attempt.

Series Two, 2004
The second series, featuring several new characters, began on BBC Three on 19 October 2004. Its continued popularity meant the repeats moved to BBC One, starting on 3 December 2004. The episodes were edited for their BBC One run, to cut out any material that might have been too offensive for the more mainstream BBC One audience. Every episode of this series ended with a Lou and Andy sketch.

Series Three, 2005
A third series began on 17 November 2005, for the first time on BBC One rather than BBC Three, and ended six weeks later. After its transmission, it was unclear whether there would be another, as many sketches were given dramatic twists and "wrapped up" (see individual character articles for more information). Lucas and Walliams were reportedly in talks for a fourth series with the BBC. Furthermore, they admitted in an interview they preferred to "kill off" certain characters in order to make way for new ones.

Little, Little Britain, 2005
In 2005, to raise money for Comic Relief, Walliams and Lucas made a special edition of the show, dubbed Little, Little Britain. The episode included a variety of sketches with celebrities including George Michael, Robbie Williams and Sir Elton John. This was released on a limited edition DVD and was released in the United States as Little, Little Britain on the region 1 version of the Little Britain: Series 2 DVD.

Little Britain Abroad, 2006
In 2006, a two-part Christmas special was released, in which characters from the programme were depicted as visiting other countries.

Little Britain Live

As a success of the television series, Lucas and Walliams created a travelling stage show based upon their series.

Comic Relief Does Little Britain Live, 2007
A special live version, featuring appearances from celebrities such as Russell Brand and Dennis Waterman was filmed in 2006 and appeared on 2007's Comic Relief show.

Little Britain USA

In 2007, Lucas and Walliams announced that there would be no more of the British Little Britain, but they taped an American continuation of the programme entitled Little Britain USA, which featured both returning characters from the British series as well as new American characters. According to Walliams, the new show was "effectively Little Britain series four". The show debuted on HBO at 10:30 pm EST Sunday 28 September 2008, then the following week on BBC One in Britain. It also started airing on The Comedy Network in Canada in January 2010.

Specials

Little Britain Comic Relief Special, 2005 
This was the first Little Britain Comic Relief special, with the usual cast and guests appearances from George Michael, Elton John, and Robbie Williams.

Comic Relief Does Little Britain Live, 2007 
The Little Britain cast returned for a second Comic Relief Special, this time live and with special guests: Russell Brand, Kate Moss, Patsy Kensit, Jonathan Ross, Kate Thornton, Chris Moyles, Dennis Waterman, Peter Kay, David Baddiel, Jeremy Edwards, and Dawn French.

Little Britain Comic Relief Special, 2009 
A crossover between the UK and USA versions, this featured guest appearances by Catherine Tate and Robbie Williams.

Little Britain Comic Relief Sketch, 2015 
Walliams reprises the role of Lou Todd for Comic Relief. Guest stars included Stephen Hawking and Catherine Tate. However, Lucas does not feature.

Little Britain Does Sport Relief, 2016 
This featured Walliams reprising the role of Emily Howard. Lucas did not feature.

Little Brexit, 2019 
This one-off special was broadcast on 31 October 2019 on BBC Radio 4. The concept was created due to Brexit, the UK's withdrawal from the EU. Lucas and Walliams both returned for this episode.

The Big Night In, 2020  
The concept was revived for The Big Night In, a 23 April 2020 telethon held during the COVID-19 pandemic, in a skit which had the pair revisiting a number of characters. Social distancing requirements meant that they appeared in separate video feeds from their own homes, and used improvised costumes.

Cast and characters

As a sketch show, Little Britain features many characters with varying degrees of costume and makeup. Matt Lucas and David Walliams play all the main characters in the show. Tom Baker narrates and Paul Putner, Steve Furst, Sally Rogers, David Foxxe, Samantha Power, Yuki Kushida, and Stirling Gallacher regularly appear as several different characters.

Other regular cast include: Anthony Head as the Prime Minister, Ruth Jones as Myfanwy, Charu Bala Chokshi as Meera, and Joann Condon as Fat Pat.

Locations

Broadcast

A two-part Christmas special, Little Britain Abroad, was broadcast in December 2006 and January 2007. This makes a total of 25 episodes to date. There has also been the Little Britain Live show.

In the UK, the series was originally broadcast on BBC Three and BBC One and was aired in repeats on Dave, Gold, and Watch. In the US and in Bermuda, the series airs on BBC America. BBC Canada has aired the program from 3 March 2005  to present. UKTV broadcasts the program in Australia and New Zealand. Comedy Central India broadcast the program for Indian audiences.

Criticism
The programme, particularly the second and third series, has been  criticised for its treatment of women and minority groups and "punch-down" comedic style. Fellow comedian Victoria Wood said that while the sketches amused her, she found them to be "very misogynistic". In 2005, Fergus Sheppard wrote in The Scotsman:

The Guardian columnist Owen Jones argued in his book Chavs: The Demonization of the Working Class that Little Britain helped to perpetuate unkind stereotypes about working-class people, exacerbated by the fact that both Walliams and Lucas attended private schools.

The series became increasingly popular with children, despite being shown after the watershed. There was also criticism from teachers that the programme led to inappropriate copycat behaviour in the playground.

Speaking in October 2017, Lucas explained that if he were to re-make Little Britain he would avoid making jokes about transvestites and would not play the role of a black character. Lucas went on to say that "Basically, I wouldn't make that show now. It would upset people. We made a more cruel kind of comedy than I'd do now ... Society has moved on a lot since then and my own views have evolved". Lucas, however, defended the decisions that were taken at the time, and explained that he and co-star Walliams deliberately sought to play a very diverse group of people. The pair went on to reproduce some of the characters - including a brief reprisal of Emily Howard, the transvestite - on the BBC's The Big Night In during the 2020 pandemic where they acknowledged in character that they would not be playing that character again.

In June 2020 Little Britain was removed from BBC iPlayer, Netflix and BritBox, alongside Come Fly with Me, for its use of blackface.  A spokesperson for the BBC said: "There's a lot of historical programming available on BBC iPlayer, which we regularly review." On its decision to remove the shows, BritBox added: "Times have changed since Little Britain first aired, so it is not currently available on BritBox."  Speaking shortly after the removal, Lucas and Walliams apologised again, saying: "Once again we want to make it clear that it was wrong and we are very sorry."

In March 2022 Little Britain was restored to BBC iPlayer after scenes containing the use of blackface with the character of Desiree DeVere were removed and a content warning was included. In a statement, the BBC said "Little Britain has been made available to fans on BBC iPlayer following edits made to the series by Matt and David that better reflect the changes in the cultural landscape over the last 20 years since the show was first made."

Spin-offs and merchandise

"I'm Gay", the song that Matt Lucas's character Daffyd Thomas sang at the end of the Little Britain Live shows, was released as a CD single in Australia in March 2007 and reached number 66 on the ARIA Singles Chart.

Matt Lucas and Peter Kay, in the guise of their characters Andy Pipkin and Brian Potter, re-recorded the song "I'm Gonna Be (500 Miles)" with its creators, The Proclaimers. This version was released as a charity single for Comic Relief on 19 March 2007.

Little Britain: The Video Game was released in February 2007. It featured a variety of characters in mini-games and received very negative reviews, being referred to by some as one of the worst games ever made.

The Russian series Nasha Russia is inspired by Little Britain.

In 2010, characters returned for Nationwide Building Society adverts, including Lou and Andy, Vicky Pollard and Eddie (Emily) Howard.

Little Britain Productions
Little Britain Productions is a production company set up by Lucas and Walliams, to produce their future television projects, such as Come Fly with Me, Rock Profile and The One....

Home media

VHS
On 11 October 2004, Little Britain The Complete First Series was released on VHS.

DVD

See also

List of fictional prime ministers of the United Kingdom

References
Informational notes

Citations

Further reading
 
 Carol Szabolcs (2008). Little Britain in America. Minorities under subverted scrutiny. Grin Verlag. .

External links

  

/radio4
Little Britain official website
Little Britain USA official website

 
2000 radio programme debuts
2003 British television series debuts
2006 British television series endings
2000s British television sketch shows
2000s British LGBT-related comedy television series
2020s British television sketch shows
2020s British LGBT-related comedy television series
2000s British satirical television series
2020s British satirical television series
BBC Radio 4 programmes
BBC television sketch shows
Blackface theatre
Cross-dressing in television
English comedy duos
English-language television shows
International Emmy Award for best comedy series winners
LGBT-related controversies in television
LGBT-related controversies in the United Kingdom
Race-related controversies in television
Radio programs adapted into television shows
Television series based on radio series
Television series produced at Pinewood Studios
Television shows adapted into video games
Television series by BBC Studios